Thomas Ford (1598–1674) was an English nonconformist minister, a member of the Westminster Assembly and ejected minister of 1662.

Life
He was born at Brixton, Devon. He entered, in Easter term 1619, as a batler in Magdalen Hall, Oxford, proceeding B.A. on 22 February 1624, and M.A. 1 June 1627. Taking orders, he became tutor in his hall for several years. His opinions were those of a Puritan, and were openly held. They attracted the attention of William Laud.

Accepted Frewen, then president of Magdalen College, Oxford,  relocated the communion-table in the college chapel, making it into an altar according to Puritan views. Several of the preachers at St Mary's Church inveighed against this innovation. Ford in his turn preached (on 2 Thess. ii. 10) 12 June 1631, and offered some reflections on making the Eucharist a sacrifice, setting up altars instead of tables, and bowing to them. This plain speaking having excited the wrath of the Laudian party, the next Saturday the vice-chancellor William Smyth called Ford before him and demanded a copy of his sermon. Ford offered to give him one if he demanded it ‘statutably.’ The vice-chancellor then ordered him to surrender himself prisoner at the castle. He refused to go unless accompanied by a beadle or a servant. The following Saturday the vice-chancellor sealed up his study, and afterwards searched his books and papers, but found nothing that could be urged against him. In the meantime an information was sent to Laud, then chancellor of the university, who returned orders to punish the preachers. Thereupon a citation in his name was fixed on St. Mary's, 2 July, commanding Ford's appearance before the vice-chancellor on the 5th. Appearing on the day appointed he was pressed to take an oath, ex officio, to answer any questions about his sermon; but he refused it, because there were no interrogatories in writing. He again offered a copy of his sermon if demanded according to the statutes, and the next day delivered one, which was accepted. But on pretence of former contumacy the vice-chancellor commanded him again to surrender himself prisoner. Ford appealed from him to the congregation, and delivered his appeal in writing to the proctors (Atherton Bruch and John Doughty). They carried it to convocation, who referred the cause to delegates, a majority of whom, upon a full hearing, acquitted him of all breach of the peace. From them the vice-chancellor himself appealed to convocation, who again appointed delegates; but the time limited by statute expired before they could arrive at a decision. Laud then brought the cause before the king and council, who heard it at Woodstock 23 August. Ford, when questioned by the king, stuck to his statement. In the end he was sentenced to quit the university within four days. Many of the scholars in their gowns, assembled at Magdalen to conduct him out of the city.

Soon afterwards Ford was invited by the magistrates of Plymouth to become their lecturer. Laud procured letters from the king forbidding the townsmen to elect Ford on pain of his majesty's displeasure, and another to the Bishop of Exeter, commanding him not to admit him in case he should be elected. Ford went abroad as chaplain to an English regiment under the command of Colonel George Fleetwood, in the service of Gustavus Adolphus. He travelled with the colonel into Germany, and was for some time in garrison at Stode and Elbing. The English merchants at Hamburg invited him to be their minister, but he returned home. He was instituted to the rectory of Aldwinkle All Saints, Northamptonshire, 18 October 1637, a preferment which he owed to Sir Myles Fleetwood.

In 1640 he was elected proctor for the clergy of the diocese of Peterborough in the convocation which framed the so-called et cetera oath. He held his rectory for ten years; but on the outbreak of the First English Civil War, after a short stay at Exeter, he retired to London, and was chosen minister of St Faith under St Paul's, and in 1644, on the death of Oliver Bowles, a member of the Westminster Assembly. Ford afterwards settled at Exeter, where he exercised an evangelical ministry. He preached in the choir of Exeter Cathedral, as his brother pastors, Lewis Stucley and Thomas Mall, did in the nave. Calamy relates that in 1649, Major-general John Desborough, who quartered there, expelled Ford for refusing the engagement. He was appointed minister of St. Lawrence, Exeter, and also acted as an assistant-commissioner for Devon.

The enforcement of the Act of Uniformity 1662 obliged him to desist from preaching publicly. A year later he was compelled by the Oxford Act to move to Exmouth, about nine miles from Exeter, where he lived very privately. When the Declaration of Indulgence came out he returned to Exeter, but in feeble health. He died in December 1674, in his seventy-sixth year, and was buried on the 28th in St. Lawrence's Church, Exeter, near his wife, Bridget Fleetwood, and several of his children.

Works
His writings are as follows:

 ‘Singing of Psalmes the duty of Christians under the New Testament, or a vindication of that Gospel-Ordinance in V sermons upon Ephesians v. 19,’ London, 1659; 2nd edit., with additions, the same year. 
 ‘The Sinner condemned of himself: being a Plea for God against all the Ungodly, proving them alone guilty of their own destruction,’ London, 1668. 
 ‘Scripture's Self-Evidence, proving it to be the only Rule of Faith’.

He preached once before the commons, 30 July 1645, and once before the lords, at a fast held 29 April 1646, and his sermons were published.

References

1598 births
1674 deaths
English Caroline nonconforming clergy
Westminster Divines
English ministers refusing the engagement of 1649
Ejected English ministers of 1662
People from South Hams (district)
Alumni of Magdalen Hall, Oxford